is a private university in Tsurumi-ku, Yokohama, Kanagawa Prefecture, Japan.

The predecessor of the school was founded in 1941. It was chartered as a junior college in 1966 and became a four-year college two years later. A subsidiary one-year coursework campus was established in Midori-ku, Yokohama in 1995.

External links
 Official website 

Educational institutions established in 1941
Private universities and colleges in Japan
Universities and colleges in Yokohama
American football in Japan
1941 establishments in Japan